is a Japanese-Filipino-Singaporean anime television series produced by ASI Animation Studio and Shin-Ei Animation. Announced in 2016, the first season premiered on October 21, 2018, in the Philippines on GMA Network and worldwide on GMA Pinoy TV.

The series features voice roles from a Filipino ensemble cast: including Migo Adecer, Julie Anne San Jose, Ruru Madrid, Kelley Day, John Arcilla, Edu Manzano, and Cherie Gil. Barangay 143 follows the coming of age story of a young man of Filipino and Korean descent who went to Manila to search for his long-lost father, all while he entered a local basketball league at a barangay in Tondo.

Barangay 143 was released in Netflix on October 1, 2020, where it later entered the top ten "most watched titles" on Netflix Asia. The series was also released on the Filipino streaming service POPTV on November 18, 2020. A second season was announced on November 28, and was subsequently released on December 12, 2020, on POPTV.

Plot
Two years before the start of the series, Roberto "Coach B" Sebastián, Sr.'s son, Roberto "Basti" Sebastián, Jr., was killed by a gunman from a large syndicate which brought down the Barangay 143's Powerhouse team and led to today's events.

Bren Park, a player for a Korean basketball team, had lost recently his family in a tragic accident during a snowstorm in South Korea that led him to quit basketball. However, following a revelation that he was his mother's child to a Filipino man, Bren went to Manila to search for him. Along the way, he joined a local basketball team, the Puzakals of Barangay 143.

Characters

Main cast
Bren T. Park

A former Korea U-19 National Basketball Team member, who emigrated to Philippines in order to fulfill his parents' will and to find his true biological Father who is a Filipino.
Victoria "Vicky" Sebastián

Joaquín "Wax" Rivera

Jinri Choi

Roberto "Coach B/Bobby" Sebastián, Sr.

He is the head coach of Team Puzakals, and a father to Vicky and the team. He is currently seeking justice for his son, Basti, who was killed two years ago.
Commissioner Jack "Jumping" Rivera

Sophia Rivera

Wax's mother and a wife to Jack who will do anything in order to remove the obstacles in her plans.

Supporting cast
Koboy Guerrero

The Puzakals' resident Batangueño fast talker who brings unexpected happenings and objects to his team.
Buchoy

A punky street-smart kid who is a son of a vagrant and an OFW, and loves Basketball who accidentally befriends Bren immediately. He serves as the Team's Waterboy. 
Dara T. Park

Tita "Baby" Dela Cruz

A former head nanny to the Park family who made her fortune back in Manila as a successful carinderia entrepreneur and as a Ward Chief Executive. She is known to be maternal in nature in her ward.
Ipe Aguilar

Melody

Wax's ex-girlfriend who hates Vicky and she is spoiled-brat girl.
Yumi's Mom

Young Sophia

Danny "Dandoy" Chan

A Chinese Filipino who barely speaks Philippine Hokkien well and is involved with the shady practices in PIBA and with the syndicate, Black Dragons
Shugo Sikat

Batang Commissioner  (Young "Jumping" Jack Rivera)

Coach Caloy/Grandmaster 

He is Coach B's mentor who aides making decisions for the team and their improvement. He also serves as adviser to him in matters that deal with Basti's death. He is also the leader of Mafia syndicate called Black Dragons.
Junior Hernando

A short and muscular, yet surprisingly gentle member of the Puzakals.
Chikoy Poh

The Puzakals' Chinese Filipino player who is a Self-proclaimed playboy.
Abdul Salik

The Puzakals' tallest member and Center. Despite of his height, he is very quiet in demeanor.
Norman Nazareno

Media

Anime

Production
Quezon City-based ASI Studios, a joint venture between Filipino firm Synergy88 and Singaporean company August Media Holdings is the production company behind Barangay 143.

TV Asahi is responsible for Barangay 143'''s direction as well as coming up with character designs for the series. ASI Studios wrote the script and lead the production of the series.

A Comeback GMA Network Sylvia Sanchez to voice Kapitana Baby Dela Cruz but replaced by actress Lorna Tolentino.

It is described by the producers as a "360-degree concept" and a story of love, hubris, drama, crime and basketball.

The anime series is initially produced in Tagalog by a "celebrity cast"

In July 2018, the voice cast were announced, along with a new release date and a television network to air to.

Broadcast and distributionBarangay 143 is primarily targeted towards the youth/young-adult market of the Philippines and is planned to be released in other Southeast Asian countries as well. Aside from Tagalog, Barangay 143 will also have and English-language release. It was first reported to air in the Philippines in Spring 2017. In July 2018, the series is announced to air on GMA Network in October 2018.

It is yet to be announced if the series is to be broadcast in Japan.

TV Asahi and August Rights, August Media Holdings' distribution arm will be responsible for the international distribution of the anime.

The series went on hiatus in December 2018, and while it was expected to return in February, it was announced it will return early April 2019.

The series also premiered on Netflix on October 1, 2020, where it became one of the "most watched titles" in Netflix Asia. The series was released on the Filipino streaming service POPTV on November 18.

A second season was announced on November 28. It was released on December 12 on POPTV.

 Episode list 

 Season 1 (2018–19) 

 Season 2 (2020–21) 

Other media
Prior to the release of the anime, a mobile game entitled, Barangay Basketball was released to iTunes and the Google Play Store. The game revolves around Wax, a son of a former star player, who is eager to prove that he is a player on his own right and undergoes training under the four basketball masters of Barangay 143. The mobile game serves as a prequel to Barangay 143. The game was also nominated for the People's Choice Award category of the International Mobile Gaming Awards for Southeast Asia.

In October 2016, August Media Holdings announced that a subscription game with a telecommunications company will be launched soon.

 Soundtrack 
Most of the songs used in the anime series were released on the music-streaming service, Spotify, and has its own official music videos on YouTube, which is present at their YouTube channel.

 Original Composition 

 Dito sa Barangay 143 - performed by Gloc-9 feat. Maya
 Alanganin - performed by Kris Lawrence and Krizza Neri; composed by Thyro and Yumi
 Para sa isa't isa - performed by Nina and JinHo Bae; composed by Vehnee Saturno
 Salamin - performed by Top Suzara and Harlem Ty; written and composed by Top Suzara
 Liga Ng Buhay - performed by Top Suzara and Harlem Ty; composed by Thyro, Yumi and Shehyee
 Basketboleros - performed by Kevin Yadao; composed by Randy Santiago
 Frozen in Time - performed by Alyssa Quijano; composed by Thyro and Yum

 Reception 
According to AGB Nielsen Philippines' Nationwide Urban Television Audience Measurement People in Television Homes, the pilot episode of Barangay 143'' earned a 4.4% rating.

Awards

References

External links
 
 

Anime-influenced Western animated television series
Basketball in anime and manga
Japanese sports television series
Television shows set in Manila
Philippine sports television series
Philippine animated television series
Singaporean animated television series
GMA Network original programming
TV Asahi original programming